Cătălina Cristea (born 2 June 1975) is a former tennis player from Romania. She was ranked No. 59 in singles (21 July 1997) and No. 40 in doubles (17 August 1998). She retired from professional tennis in September 2001, before returning in 2005; she ultimately retired September 2005 aged 30.

Playing for Romania Fed Cup team, Cristea has a win–loss record of 20–13.

Junior Grand Slam finals

Doubles (0–1)

WTA career finals

Doubles: 4 (1–3)

ITF Circuit finals

Singles (1–3)

Doubles (6–1)

Head-to-head record
Players who have been ranked world No. 1 are in boldface.

 Lindsay Davenport 0–2
 Mary Pierce 0–3
 Conchita Martínez 0–1
 Natasha Zvereva 1–0
 Jana Novotná 0–1
 Elena Likhovtseva 0–4
 Alexandra Fusai 0–2
 Nathalie Tauziat 0–1
 Corina Morariu 1–2
 Lisa Raymond 0–1
 Karina Habšudová 1–1
 Ai Sugiyama 1–2
 Amélie Mauresmo 1–0
 Nadia Petrova 1–0

External links
 
 
 

1975 births
Living people
Tennis players from Bucharest
Romanian female tennis players
Tennis players at the 1996 Summer Olympics
Olympic tennis players of Romania